Francis Tanner Tessmann (born September 24, 2001) is an American professional soccer player who plays as a midfielder for  club Venezia.

Club career

Academy and reserve
Tessmann moved to the FC Dallas academy in 2016 from the BUSA soccer academy in his home state of Alabama. In 2019, whilst with the Dallas academy, Tessmann also appeared for the club's professional USL League One affiliate team North Texas SC.

FC Dallas
Following his time with FC Dallas and North Texas SC, Tessmann committed to play both college soccer and college football, as a kicker, at Clemson University. However, on February 27, 2020, Tessmann opted to play professional soccer and signed with Major League Soccer side FC Dallas as a homegrown player.

Tessmann made his Dallas debut on February 29, 2020, starting and tallying an assist in a 2–0 win over Philadelphia Union. Over the course of the 2020 season Tessmann played in 19 matches, starting 9 times and playing a total of 1001 minutes. With FC Dallas having qualified for the 2020 MLS playoffs, he made his postseason debut in the first round and successfully converted a penalty in a Shootout victory against the Portland Timbers. He made his first postseason start in the next round, a 1–0 loss to the Seattle Sounders.

In 2021 he continued to gain first team experiences, starting 6 of the first 12 matches for FC Dallas and playing a total of 452 minutes across 7 appearances.

Venezia 
On July 15, 2021, Tessmann signed for newly promoted Serie A side Venezia.

International career
In January 2021, Tessmann was called up to the senior national team. He made his debut in a 7–0 win against Trinidad and Tobago. Following that game, Tessmann was named to the United States under-23 team for the 2020 CONCACAF Men's Olympic Qualifying Championship after Ulysses Llanez dropped out with an injury. They would fail to qualify for the Olympics.

Career statistics

Club

International

Personal life
Tessmann is the godson of American football head coach Dabo Swinney.

References

External links 
 
 
Profile at FC Dallas
 

2001 births
Living people
American soccer players
American people of German descent
Association football midfielders
North Texas SC players
FC Dallas players
Venezia F.C. players
Soccer players from Birmingham, Alabama
People from Hoover, Alabama
USL League One players
Major League Soccer players
Serie A players
Homegrown Players (MLS)
United States men's international soccer players
American expatriate soccer players
Expatriate footballers in Italy
American expatriate sportspeople in Italy